Four Fish: The Future of the Last Wild Food is a 2010 nonfiction book by author Paul Greenberg.  This work explores the state of commercial fishing and aquaculture. Greenberg frames his observations by commenting on the status of four specific fish: cod, salmon, bass, and tuna. Choosing four fish was a decision influenced by author Michael Pollan's selection of four plants in his book, The Botany of Desire. 

The New York Times gave the book a positive review. David Helvarg gave the book a positive review on sfgate.com. The book was reviewed by The Los Angeles Times.

Publication data
Paul Greenberg Four Fish (2010) Penguin Books, hardcover: , 2011 paperback:

References

Fishing industry